Synthonia is short for Synthetic Ammonia, a product produced by chemical company I.C.I.  ICI produced this product at one of its many plants in Billingham in the 20th century.  Many local facilities took on the name due to sponsorship from this local firm including Billingham Synthonia F.C., Cricket Club and Synthonia Scout troop to name just a few.

See also
Billingham

Imperial Chemical Industries
Synthetic materials
Billingham
Ammonia